Denise Lucy Wilson is a New Zealand health academic. She is currently a full professor of Māori health at the Auckland University of Technology. She is a fellow of the Royal Society Te Apārangi.

Academic career

After a background in nursing Wilson did an MSc titled 'Through the looking glass: nurses' responses to women experiencing partner abuse' and PhD titled 'Ngā kairaranga oranga / The weavers of health and wellbeing: a grounded theory study''' at the Massey University. She then moved to the Auckland University of Technology, rising to full professor.

She has received media coverage for her work on domestic violence.
She is a keynote speaker at the biennial All Together Better Health (ATBH) Conferences organized by World Committee.

 Awards 
In 2019 Wilson was elected a fellow of the American Academy of Nursing. In March 2021, she was made a fellow of the Royal Society Te Apārangi, recognising her research is "greatly contributing to efforts to reduce health disparities of Māori and other Indigenous people globally".

 Selected works 
 Wilson, Denise, and Stephen Neville. "Culturally safe research with vulnerable populations." Contemporary Nurse 33, no. 1 (2009): 69–79.
 Huntington, Annette, Jean Gilmour, Anthony Tuckett, Stephen Neville, Denise Wilson, and Catherine Turner. "Is anybody listening? A qualitative study of nurses' reflections on practice." Journal of Clinical Nursing 20, no. 9‐10 (2011): 1413–1422.
 Wilson, Denise. "The significance of a culturally appropriate health service for Indigenous Māori women." Contemporary Nurse 28, no. 1-2 (2008): 173–188.
 Wilson, Denise, and Stephen Neville. "Nursing their way not our way: Working with vulnerable and marginalised populations." Contemporary Nurse 27, no. 2 (2008): 165–176.
 Wilson, Denise, and Pipi Barton. "Indigenous hospital experiences: a New Zealand case study." Journal of Clinical Nursing'' 21, no. 15‐16 (2012): 2316–2326.

Personal life
Wilson is Māori, of Ngāti Tahinga descent.

References

External links
  

Living people
New Zealand women academics
Massey University alumni
Academic staff of the Auckland University of Technology
Waikato Tainui people
New Zealand nurses
New Zealand medical researchers
Year of birth missing (living people)
New Zealand Māori academics
New Zealand Māori women academics

Fellows of the Royal Society of New Zealand
Fellows of the American Academy of Nursing